Cani or similar can mean:
 Canoe Association of Northern Ireland, the Northern Irish CANI
 Cañi, a Spanish word
 CANI, an acronym for "constant and never-ending improvement" used by Tony Robbins in his "Personal Power" book

People
 Cani (Spanish footballer)
 Cañi (footballer)
 Edgar Çani, an Albanian footballer
 Nevian Cani, an Albanian footballer
 Miriam Cani, an Albanian singer
 Dhimiter Çani, an Albanian sculptor
 Shkëlqim Cani, a Governor of the Bank of Albania
 Luigi Cani, a U.S. skydiver
 Ladislav Čáni, a Slovak canoer
 Roberto Cani, an Italian violinist
 John Cani, a Catholic bishop

Distinguish from
Canine (disambiguation)
Canid
Canis, a species of carnivorous mammal